Stucchi may refer to:

 Stucchi (cycling team), an Italian professional cycling team
 Stucchi & Co., the later name (beginning in 1901) of Prinetti & Stucchi
 Giosuè Stucchi, former Italian professional football player

See also 

 Stussy and Cool S